Streptocephalus is a genus of fairy shrimp found in temporary waters in Africa, Australia, Eurasia, and Central and North America, following its ancient origin in Gondwana. It contains the following species:

Streptocephalus annanarivensis Thiele, 1907
Streptocephalus antillensis Mattox, 1950
Streptocephalus areva Brehm, 1954
Streptocephalus bidentatus Hamer & Appleton, 1993
Streptocephalus bimaris Gurney, 1909
Streptocephalus bourquinii Hamer & Appleton, 1993
Streptocephalus bouvieri Daday, 1908
Streptocephalus cafer (Lovén, 1847)
Streptocephalus caljoni Beladjal, Mertens & Dumont, 1996
Streptocephalus cirratus Daday, 1908
Streptocephalus cladophorus Barnard, 1924
Streptocephalus coomansi Brendonck & Belk, 1993
Streptocephalus dendrophorus Hamer & Appleton, 1993
Streptocephalus dendyi Barnard, 1929
Streptocephalus dichotomus Baird, 1860
Streptocephalus distinctus Thiele, 1907
Streptocephalus dorothae Mackin, 1942
Streptocephalus dregi G. O. Sars, 1899
Streptocephalus echinus Bond, 1934
Streptocephalus gauthieri Brtek, 1974
Streptocephalus gracilis G. O. Sars, 1898
Streptocephalus guzmani Maeda-Martínez et al., 1995
Streptocephalus henridumontis Maeda-Martínez & Obregón-Barboza, 2005
Streptocephalus indistinctus Barnard, 1924
Streptocephalus jakubskii Grochmalicki, 1921
Streptocephalus javanensis Brehm, 1955
Streptocephalus kaokoensis Barnard, 1929
Streptocephalus kargesi Spicer, 1985
Streptocephalus lamellifer Thiele, 1900
Streptocephalus linderi W. G. Moore, 1966
Streptocephalus longimanus Bond, 1934
Streptocephalus mackini W. G. Moore, 1966
Streptocephalus macrourus Daday, 1908
Streptocephalus mattoxi Maeda-Martínez et al., 1995
Streptocephalus moorei Belk, 1973
Streptocephalus namibiensis Hamer & Brendonck, 1993
Streptocephalus neumanni Thiele, 1904
Streptocephalus ovamboensis Barnard, 1924
Streptocephalus papillatus G. O. Sars, 1906
Streptocephalus potosinensis Maeda-Martínez et al., 1995
Streptocephalus proboscideus (Frauenfeld, 1873)
Streptocephalus propinquus Brady, 1916
Streptocephalus purcelli G. O. Sars, 1898
Streptocephalus queenslandicus Herbert & Timms, 2000
Streptocephalus reunionensis Thiéry & Champeau, 1994
Streptocephalus rothschildi Daday, 1908
Streptocephalus rubricaudatus (Klunzinger, 1867)
Streptocephalus rugosus Brehm, 1960
Streptocephalus sealii Ryder, 1879
 Streptocephalus shinsawbuae Shu, Rogers, Chen & Sanoamuang, 2018
Streptocephalus similis Baird, 1852
Streptocephalus simplex Gurney, 1906
Streptocephalus sirindhornae Sanoamuang et al., 2000
Streptocephalus spinicaudatus Hamer & Appleton, 1993
Streptocephalus spinifer Gurney, 1906
Streptocephalus spinosus Daday, 1908
Streptocephalus sudanicus Daday de Dées, 1910
Streptocephalus texanus Packard, 1871
Streptocephalus thomasbowmani Maeda-Martínez & Obregón-Barboza, 2005
Streptocephalus torvicornis (Waga, 1842)
Streptocephalus trifidus Hartland-Rowe, 1969
Streptocephalus vitreus (Brauer, 1877)
Streptocephalus wirminghausi Hamer, 1994
Streptocephalus woottoni Eng et al., 1990
Streptocephalus zeltneri Daday, 1910
Streptocephalus zuluensis Brendonck & Hamer, 1992

References

Anostraca
Branchiopoda genera
Taxonomy articles created by Polbot